Agarista-ȘS Anenii Noi is a women's football team from Anenii Noi, Moldova. It competes in the Moldovan women's football championship.

They made their European debut in the 2018–19 UEFA Women's Champions League.

Current squad
 As of 6 June 2021, according to UEFA's website''''

Record in UEFA competitionsAll results (home, away and aggregate) list Agarista-ȘS Anenii Noi's goal tally first.''

References

Women's football clubs in Moldova